Kim Il-chol (born 1933) is a former member of the North Korean National Defence Commission and former Minister for Defence.

He was born in Pyongyang in 1933. He graduated from Mangyongdae Revolutionary School and the "Soviet Union Naval Academy". Although the North Korean army mainly depends on ground troops, Admiral Kim who was commander of the Korean People's Navy since 1982 was installed in the highest military position of the head of the Minister of the People's Armed Forces in 1998, filling a vacancy left by Choe Kwang, who died in February 1997, something that indicated that he was fully trusted by Kim Jong-il. Kim Il-chol participated as a senior delegate in the inter-Korean Defense Minister’s meeting held for the first time since the division of the Korean peninsula in September 2000.

Kim was appointed to the National Defence Commission in 1988.  He was removed from all positions in 2010, reportedly due to his advanced age.

Kim is currently a member of the Korea-China Association for Civil Exchange Promotion.

He has been awarded the Hero of the Republic, Order of Kim Il-sung and the Order of the National Flag (1st Class).

References

1933 births
Living people
North Korean military personnel
North Korean politicians
People from Pyongyang
Defence ministers of North Korea